Saugerties Light, known also as the Saugerties Lighthouse, is a lighthouse on the Hudson River north of Saugerties, New York.

History
When it was built in 1869, it replaced the earlier 1838 lighthouse.  Its Coast Guard service was ended in 1954.  It is currently managed by the non-profit Saugerties Lighthouse Conservancy which purchased the lighthouse in 1986 and has restored it.  The conservancy manages the nature trail leading to the lighthouse, offers two bed and breakfast rooms and public tours.  A small museum displays artifacts of the original lighthouse and the restoration efforts, as well as the history of the Saugerties waterfront.

The lighthouse keeper of 1835 was Abraham Persons.  He was paid $350 for the year.

The US Coast Guard has identified Saugerties Light as one of its Historic Light Stations in New York.

Saugerties Light is shown on the NOAA Chart 12347.

Cultural
The Archives Center at the Smithsonian National Museum of American History has a collection (#1055) of souvenir postcards of lighthouses and has digitized 272 of these and made them available online.  These include postcards of Saugerties Light with links to customized nautical charts provided by National Oceanographic and Atmospheric Administration.

Saugerties Light is listed on the National Park Service's Maritime Heritage Program list of lighthouses to visit, and as one of New York's Historic Light Stations.

Notes

References

 DeWire, Elinor, "Saugerties Lighthouse." Mariners Weather Log (Spring 1994).

External links
 
 
 Official Site
 Hudson Lights
 Lighthouse Depot
 Lighthouse Friends
 Lighthouses of the Hudson
 Lighthouses R Us
 US Lighthouse Society
 Lighthouse Characteristics for Long Island Sound and lower Hudson River

Lighthouses completed in 1838
Lighthouses completed in 1869
Houses completed in 1869
Lighthouses on the National Register of Historic Places in New York (state)
National Register of Historic Places in Ulster County, New York
Hudson River
Saugerties, New York
Museums in Ulster County, New York
Lighthouse museums in New York (state)
1838 establishments in New York (state)
Transportation buildings and structures in Ulster County, New York